Arienne Mandi is an American actress best known for playing Dani Núñez in The L Word: Generation Q.

Career 
Mandi appeared in the shows, NCIS, Hawaii Five-O, The Interns, NCIS: Los Angeles, and In The Vault. She also played the lead in the film Baja.

Personal life 
Mandi was born in Los Angeles, California. She is Chilean and Iranian. Mandi is fluent in Spanish, French, Persian and English. She made the following statement in regards to her sexuality: "If there were to be anything close to what I feel it would be pan. I accept love in all forms and I give love. It’s just all love." In a podcast episode of Scissoring Isn't A Thing, Mandi confirmed that Nazanin Mandi is her cousin.

References

External links 
 
 

Actresses of Iranian descent
Actresses of Chilean descent
American television actresses
LGBT actresses
LGBT people from California
Living people
Pansexual actresses
Year of birth missing (living people)
American LGBT actors
21st-century LGBT people
21st-century American women